Shoqan Rural District is a rural district (dehestan) in Jolgeh Shoqan District, Jajrom County, North Khorasan Province, Iran. At the 2006 census, its population was 2,538, in 725 families.  The rural district has 11 villages.

References 

Rural Districts of North Khorasan Province
Jajrom County